Jahanbakht is a common surname in Persian, and may refer to:

People
Jahanbakht Tofigh, Iranian freestyle wrestler.